The St. Nicholas of Tolentine Church is a Roman Catholic parish located in the South Philadelphia neighborhood of Philadelphia, Pennsylvania within the Archdiocese of Philadelphia. St. Nicks is one of two remaining ethnically Italian parishes in the South Vicariate, the other being St. Donato's of West Philadelphia. Both parishes give Mass in Italian, as well as English, and consist of a heavily Italian American congregation. The church is located on 9th and Watkins' Streets in South Philadelphia.

History
The church of St. Nicholas of Tolentine owes its beginnings (1912) to the Italian Augustinian priests who, at the invitation of Archbishop Patrick John Ryan, came to the Archdiocese of Philadelphia to start a church on Christian Street, between Eighth and Ninth Streets, to help minister to the very large influx of Italian immigrants. The parish of Our Lady of Good Counsel was formally established on January 8, 1898 with three Augustinians, who had arrived from Italy. They were Fr. William Repetti, pastor, Fr. Angelo Caruso, assistant and Brother Bernardino Falconi.

The Papal Delegate, Archbishop Sebastian Martinelli, O.S.A., blessed the cornerstone of Our Lady of Good Counsel Church on May 21, 1899. People began to flock to the new Italian church for baptisms, marriages and other church functions. Baptisms alone on some weekends were as many as forty. The unprecedented church activity continued for the next fourteen years. Meanwhile, many Italian families kept moving farther south in the city and, finding themselves too far from the church, began neglecting their religious obligations. The Fathers at Our Lady of Good Counsel were very concerned. They searched for a solution to this problem and found it in a small Protestant church at 9th and Watkins Streets about eight blocks south of Our Lady of Good Counsel Church. The church was up for sale! The Fathers thought they could use this building as an auxiliary or mission church to serve the Italians who were moving to this area. The following news item appeared in the Philadelphia Ledger on February 27, 1912:

Downtown Church is Sold for $14,500
The old building of Salem Congregation to be used as Catholic Church.
The building of Salem Church of the Evangelical Association of North America at the southwest corner of Ninth and Watkins Streets, below Morris, was sold to the Order of the Hermits of St. Augustine, which about two years ago, built the handsome new church of St. Rita at Broad and Federal Streets. The sale was negotiated by P. F. Kernan, real estate broker. Included in the sale of Salem Church was the two-story parsonage adjoining Ninth Street. The price paid for the church and parsonage was $14,500. The Salem building will be used, in the future, as a chapel in connection with the Catholic Church of Our Lady of Good Counsel on Christian Street, west of Eighth. It was built about eighteen years ago and it is significant of the rapid change of population in the older section of the city. It was found necessary to offer it for sale several years ago. It was held for sale until recently for $28,500. About a year ago, a Hebrew congregation entered into an agreement to purchase the church for $18,500, but the sale was not consummated.

The church and parsonage were purchased by the Augustinians with the approval of Archbishop Edmond Francis Prendergast who realized that there was a great demand for Italian speaking priests in Philadelphia.

On Sunday, April 14, 1912, Father Martin J. Geraghty, Commissary General of the Augustinians in the U.S., blessed the new chapel. The archbishop could not attend because of a previous engagement. The priest in residence there was to be the administrator. The church building had two levels which was not suited for Catholic worship. A few minor changes were made to remedy the situation. Nevertheless, in 1916, the building was torn down and the new structure was built. At 3 P.M. on Sunday, December 3, 1916, a large number of people witnessed the laying of the cornerstone of the new St. Nicholas Church. Father Alfonso Baldassare officiated. The people in the area were pleased with what was being done, and contributed according to their means. Three beautiful marble altars were donated by the Lagomarsino family, the main altar dedicated in memory of Father John Cerruti, the first administrator.

It should be remembered that, in those early days, the Augustinians of Our Lady of Good Counsel Church had to administer to the spiritual needs of Italian Catholics who lived between 8th and 12th Streets and south of Market Street as far as the Navy Yard.

For twenty-one years this new church, St. Nicholas of Tolentine, worked under the parent church, Our Lady of Good Counsel, on Christian Street. Each successive priest was an administrator, although the faithful considered him their pastor.

In 1933, Our Lady of Good Counsel Church closed its doors for good. The job of administering to the new Italian immigrants was done. There was no need for the church to remain open, although it closed to great protest by the parishioners of Our Lady of Good Counsel.

There was a long established church, St. Paul, in the same area but it was an Irish parish.

The Archdiocese of Philadelphia made St. Nicholas of Tolentine Church an official parish church by transferring the parish records of Our Lady of Good Counsel Church to St. Nicholas of Tolentine.

On Sunday, April 11, 1937, a Solemn High Mass was celebrated to commemorate the 25th Anniversary, or Silver Jubilee, of the church's opening. Father Claude Fabrizi, O.S.A. was pastor.

During these years of active ministry in Philadelphia, the Augustinians in Italy kept sending to our shores a steady flow of workers. As early as 1920, the Fathers and Brothers welcomed Augustinians from the island of Malta and from Spain. Today, most of the Augustinians serving St. Nicholas of Tolentine parish are native born Americans.

Administrators and Pastors of St. Nicholas of Tolentine
Rev. John Cerruti, O.S.A. (1912-1914)
Rev. Alfonso Baldassare, O. S. A. (1914-1926)
Rev.  Philip Panbianco, O. S. A. (1926-1927)
Rev. Eugene Fiteni, O.S.A. (1927-1928)
Rev. Lorenzo Andolfi O.S.A. (1928-1933)
Rev. Claude Fabbrizi, O.S.A. (1933-1955)
Rev. Peter Toscani, O.S.A. (1954-1958)
Rev. Louis Diorio, O.S.A. (1958-1961)
Rev. Angelo Allegrini, O.S.A. (1961-1971)
Rev. Joseph Gattinella, O.S.A. (1971-1984)
Rev. Nicholas Martorano, O.S.A. (1984-present)

Education
The designated Catholic grade school is Saint Anthony of Padua Regional Catholic School.

Previously the church had its own Catholic school, St. Nicholas of Tolentine School, which opened in 1925. The church established it to educate Italian American people. It merged with Annunciation BVM to form Saint Anthony of Padua Regional on September 1, 2012.

References

External links

Saint Anthony of Padua Regional Catholic School

History - St. Nicholas of Tolentine

Roman Catholic churches in Philadelphia
Italian-American culture in Philadelphia
Roman Catholic churches in Pennsylvania
Christian organizations established in 1912
Roman Catholic churches completed in 1916
20th-century Roman Catholic church buildings in the United States
South Philadelphia
1912 establishments in Pennsylvania